Kadenicarpus pseudomacrochele, synonym Turbinicarpus pseudomacrochele, is a species of plant in the family Cactaceae.

It is endemic to Hidalgo and Querétaro states of Mexico.  Its natural habitat is hot deserts.

It is an endangered species, threatened by habitat loss.

Subspecies 
 Kadenicarpus pseudomacrochele subsp. pseudomacrochele
 Kadenicarpus pseudomacrochele subsp. krainzianus 
 Kadenicarpus pseudomacrochele subsp. lausseri 
 Kadenicarpus pseudomacrochele subsp. minimus

References

Sources

External links
 
 

Cactoideae
Cacti of Mexico
Endemic flora of Mexico
Flora of Hidalgo (state)
Flora of Querétaro
Endangered biota of Mexico
Endangered plants
Taxonomy articles created by Polbot